Agaricus nebularum is a species of fungus in the genus Agaricus. Found in Chile, it was described as new to science in 1969 by mycologist Rolf Singer.

See also
List of Agaricus species

References

External links

nebularum
Fungi described in 1969
Fungi of Chile
Taxa named by Rolf Singer